The 2019 FA Trophy Final was a football match between AFC Fylde and Leyton Orient on 19 May 2019. It was the final match of the 2018–19 FA Trophy, the 50th season of the FA Trophy.

Route to the final

AFC Fylde

Leyton Orient

Match

Details

References

FA Trophy Finals
FA Trophy Final 2019
FA Trophy Final 2019
FA Trophy Final
FA Trophy Final
Events at Wembley Stadium
FA Trophy Final